The thirteenth season of The Real Housewives of Atlanta, an American reality television show, was broadcast by Bravo, it premiered on December 6, 2020, and is primarily filmed in Atlanta, Georgia. Its executive producers are Steven Weinstock, Glenda Hersh, Lauren Eskelin, Lorraine Haughton-Lawson, Luke Neslage, Glenda Cox, Joye Chin, and Andy Cohen.

The Real Housewives of Atlanta focuses on the lives of Kandi Burruss, Cynthia Bailey, Kenya Moore, Porsha Williams and Drew Sidora.

The season received negative reviews from fans of the show due to the uneven editing, lack of group chemistry, and slower-paced episodes. This season also marked the final regular appearances of Cynthia Bailey and Porsha Williams.

Cast 
For the thirteenth season, four of the six cast members from the previous season returned. Eva Marcille departed the series, along with NeNe Leakes, who exited the series for a second time. Actress and singer, Drew Sidora joined the cast as a Housewife, while newcower, LaToya Ali joined Marlo Hampton, and Tanya Sam as friends of the cast.

In addition to this, Falynn Pina and Shamea Morton made multiple guest appearances throughout the season. While former housewives: Shereé Whitfield, Claudia Jordan, and Eva Marcille also appeared as guests in attendance at Cynthia and Mike's wedding.

 Due to COVID-19 restrictions, the Housewives are seated in separate seats forming a semi-circle rather than the normal couches.
 During their appearance at the reunion, Hampton and Ali sit on the left side. Hampton's seat is next to Bailey, and Ali's is placed next to Hampton.
 Morton is seated on the end of the right side, next to Burruss.

Production 
Production on the season began in mid-July 2020. In November of the same year, production on the series was halted after a crew member tested positive for COVID-19; production resumed the following month.

Episodes

References

External links
 

 

2020 American television seasons
2021 American television seasons
Atlanta (season 13)